The 1999 Pendle Borough Council election took place on 6 May 1999 to elect members of Pendle Borough Council in Lancashire, England. One third of the council was up for election and the Liberal Democrats lost overall control of the council to no overall control.

After the election, the composition of the council was:
Liberal Democrat 23
Labour 20
Conservative 7
Independent 1

Campaign
Before the election the Liberal Democrats ran the council with 30 councillors, compared to 17 Labour, 3 Conservatives and 1 independent. 17 seats were being contested in the election, with the Liberal Democrats defending 12 and Labour 5. 4 sitting councillors stood down at the election, 2 each from the Liberal Democrat and Labour parties.

The only candidate not from the 3 main parties was Peter Hartley, who stood as an independent green in Vivary Bridge ward, but during the campaign it was reported that he was actually living in Sheffield and standing as a candidate there as well.

Election result
The results saw the Liberal Democrats lose their majority on the council after 4 years in control. The Liberal Democrats lost 4 seats to the Conservatives and a further 3 to the Labour party, meaning that the Liberal Democrats fell to 23 seats, Labour rose to 20, the Conservatives to 7 and there remained 1 independent. The Liberal Democrats said the other two parties had worked together to target Liberal Democrat held seats, but this was denied by the Conservative and Labour parties.

The Labour gains came in the wards of Craven, Vivary Bridge and Whitefield, while the Conservatives took the seats of Barrowford, Earby, Foulridge and Reedley. All 4 Conservatives gains were by women, meaning the Conservative group leader Roy Clarkson then had 6 female Conservative councillors in his council group. Meanwhile, the Liberal Democrats only narrowly held a further 2 seats after recounts, Edwina Sargeant holding Waterside by 9 votes and Ian Gilhespy retaining Horsfield by a single vote.

Following the election the parties were unable to agree on who should run the council. As a result, the council meeting after the election had no nominations for leader of the council. The Liberal Democrats voted down an attempt by Labour to take minority control and instead the councillors voted to rotate the chairmanship of the main committees over the next 12 months between the 3 parties.

Ward results

References

1999 English local elections
1999
1990s in Lancashire